Spammers is a card game that was published by Atlas Games in 1998.

Gameplay
Spammers is a card game in which players compete to pull off scams.

Reception
The reviewer from the online second volume of Pyramid stated that "that leaves the guys at Atlas with the problem of how do you top something like Lunch Money? Guess what folks, it looks like they just did it with another proudly iconoclastic and non-collectible card game called Spammers."

Reviews
Shadis #47 (April 1998)

References

Atlas Games games
Card games introduced in 1998